Bluvstein is a Yiddish surname, the cognate of German Blaustein, literally "blue stone". Notable people with the surname include:

 Aleksandr Bluvshtein ru,  Jewish Hero of the Soviet Union
Mark Bluvshtein, Soviet-born Jewish Canadian chess player

Yiddish-language surnames